Lianyuan is a county-level city and the 7th most populous county-level division in Hunan Province, China; it is under the administration of Loudi prefecture-level City. Located on the geographical centre of Hunan, the city is bordered to the north by Anhua and Ningxiang Counties, to the east by Louxing District, to the south by Shuangfeng, Shaodong and Xinshao Counties, to the west by Lengshuijiang City and Xinhua County. As of the 2010 census, it has a registered population of 1,162,928 and a resident population of 995,712. The city has a subdistrict, 16 towns and two townships under its jurisdiction, the government seat is Lantian Subdistrict.

History
Dividing parts of four counties of Xiangxiang, Anhua, Xinhua and Shaoyang, Lianyuan County was created in February 1952 and named after the place where it is located in the origin of the Lian River. The county-level city of Loudi (modern Louxing District) was formed by seven communes from Lianyuan County (the modern Lianyuan City) in January 1961. The county of Lianyuan was reorganized as the city of Lianyuan in 1987.

Shuidongdi Town was transferred to Louxing District on January 24, 2017. It has 16 towns, two townships and a subdistrict under jurisdiction.

Subdivisions
Shuidongdi Town from Lianyuan was transferred to Louxing District on January 24, 2017. The city of Lianyuan has two townships, 16 towns and a subdistrict under jurisdiction.

Sites of interest
There is a  twenty years old noodle restaurant in Lanxi Bridge.

Transportation
China National Highway 207

Climate

References

External links
Official website of Lianyuan Government

 
Cities in Hunan
County-level divisions of Hunan
Loudi